Giacomo Maria Radini-Tedeschi (12 July 1857 - 22 August 1914) was the Bishop of the Roman Catholic Diocese of Bergamo. Today he is famous for his strong involvement in social issues at the beginning of 20th century.

Biography
Radini-Tedeschi was born in Piacenza, the son of a wealthy and noble family. Ordained as a priest in 1879, he became professor of Church law in the diocesan seminary of Piacenza. In 1890 he joined the Secretariat of State of the Holy See and was involved in many diplomatic missions.  On 5 January 1905 he was named Bishop of the Roman Catholic Diocese of Bergamo by Pope Pius X and consecrated by him in the Sistine Chapel. A strong supporter of Catholic trade unions, he strongly backed the workers of a textile plant in Ranica during a labor dispute.

Radini-Tedeschi fell ill with cancer and died in the early days of the World War I. 
During his episcopal ministry in Bergamo, Radini-Tedeschi had as his secretary a young priest named Angelo Giuseppe Roncalli, who later became Pope John XXIII. The bishop's last words were, "Angelo, pray for peace". For the late Pope John XXIII, Radini-Tedeschi was a teacher who was never forgotten by his one time follower.

Notes

External links and additional sources
 (for Chronology of Bishops) 
 (for Chronology of Bishops) 

1857 births
1914 deaths
People from Piacenza
20th-century Italian Roman Catholic bishops
Bishops of Bergamo
Deaths from cancer in Lombardy
Burials in Lombardy
Pope John XXIII